Ani Kaaro (–1901) was a New Zealand tribal leader and prophet. Of Māori descent, she identified with the Nga Puhi iwi.

References

1901 deaths
Ngāpuhi people
New Zealand Māori religious leaders
Year of birth missing